Köseli can refer to the following villages in Turkey:

 Köseli, Bala
 Köseli, Bismil
 Köseli, Cide
 Köseli, Kozan
 Köseli, Tut